The Mad Hatters is a 1935 British comedy film directed by Ivar Campbell and starring Chili Bouchier, Sydney King and Evelyn Foster.

Plot
After opening a hat shop together, two men fall in love with a French woman living next door.

Cast
 Chili Bouchier ...  Vicki
 Sydney King ...  Tim Stanhope
 Evelyn Foster ...  Ruth Stanhope
 Kim Peacock ...  Joe
 Grace Lane ...  Mrs. Stanhope
 Bellenden Clarke ...  General Stanhope
 Tosca von Bissing ...  Duchess
 Vera Bogetti ...  Lady Felicity

References

External links

1935 films
1935 comedy films
British comedy films
Films produced by Anthony Havelock-Allan
Films directed by Ivar Campbell
British black-and-white films
Paramount Pictures films
British and Dominions Studios films
Films shot at Imperial Studios, Elstree
1930s English-language films
1930s British films
English-language comedy films